Kyrgyzstan employs a five-point grading system:

Teachers and professors enter grades into an official book carried by each student, which is usually called by its Russian name of zachòtka.  Students then display these books to potential employers and universities.

References 

Kyrgyzstan
Grading